Frank Harvey (1912–1981) was an English screenwriter and playwright who jointly won a BAFTA Award with John Boulting and Alan Hackney for I'm All Right Jack in 1960. During his career he was nominated for a second BAFTA for Private's Progress.

Biography 
He was born on 11 August 1912 in Manchester, Lancashire, his father was Frank Harvey and his mother was Grace Ackerman. He died on 6 November 1981 in Ottery St. Mary, Devon. He was the third of three generations of writers who all took the non-de plume 'Frank Harvey'. His grandfather, originally John Ainsworth Hilton, and his father, originally Harvey Ainsworth Hilton, all took the name when writing and performing for the stage.

His father, Harvey Ainsworth Hilton also called Frank Harvey (1883–1965) was born in London, England before he moved to Australia in 1914 and did not return until 1926. Harvey was an actor and a playwright, producing 4 plays including The Last Enemy (1929) and Cape Forlorn (1930).

Harvey Junior spent part of his childhood in Australia. He studied at Cambridge, where he began acting, later moving into writing.

In November 1947 he produced The Moon in the Yellow River by Denis Johnston at the Arts Theatre, London, starring Jack Hawkins.

Personal 
Frank Harvey married Margaret Inchbold, the great niece of the Pre-Raphaelite painter John William Inchbold, on 21 December 1936. They had two sons. He had a half-sister, Helen, from his father's second marriage to Helen Rosamond 'Bobbie' McMillan, daughter of Sir William McMillan, Minister for Railways in New South Wales, Australia.

Filmography
Screenwriter
 The Day After the Fair (Play) (TV Movie) (1986)
I'm All Right Jack (1960)
Private's Progress (1956)
Heavens Above! (1963)
The 39 Steps (1959)
Seven Days to Noon (1950)
The Long Memory (1953)
 Brothers in Law (1957)
 The Day After the Fair (TV Movie) (1974)
 No, My Darling Daughter (1961)
 The World in My Pocket (1961)
 Upstairs and Downstairs (1959)
 Danger Within (1959)
 Josephine and Men (Script and additional scenes) (1955)
 Seagulls Over Sorrento (1954)
 High Treason (1951)
 The Poltergeist (TV Movie) (1950)
 The Chertsey Apprentice (TV Movie) (1956)
 Elizabeth of Ladymead (1949)
 Portrait from Life (1949)
 My Brother's Keeper (1948)
 The True Glory (Documentary) (1945)
 Burma Victory (Documentary) (1946)
 It Happened One Sunday (1944)
 Saloon Bar (1940)

Actor
 The Young Idea (1934) Festival Theatre, Cambridge
 Road to Moscow (Narrator) (1944)
 The Unthinking Lobster (1948) BBC TV
 High Treason (1951)

Plays
 Saloon Bar (1939)
 Brighton Rock (1943)
 The Poltergeist (1946)
 Elizabeth of Ladymead (1948)
 The Non-Resident (1950)
 The Chertsey Apprentice (1952)
 Norman (1963)
 The Day After the Fair (1972)

Television 
 Teatro de siempre (TV Series) (1 episode) (1978)
 Estudio 1 (TV Series) (1 episode) (1982)
 ITV Television Playhouse (TV Series) (1 episode) (1957)

External links

References

1912 births
1981 deaths
Best British Screenplay BAFTA Award winners
English male screenwriters
20th-century English screenwriters
20th-century English male writers